Gunhild Ørn (born 22 March 1970) is a Norwegian cyclist. She was born in Stavanger. She competed in the 1992 Summer Olympics in Barcelona.

References

External links
 

1970 births
Living people
Sportspeople from Stavanger
Norwegian female cyclists
Olympic cyclists of Norway
Cyclists at the 1992 Summer Olympics